Nick Salihamidžić Copado (born 8 February 2003) is a German-Bosnian professional footballer who plays as a right-back for  club Cosenza, on loan from Bayern Munich II.

Club career
Salihamidžić started his career with German club Bayern Munich II. In 2022, he was sent on loan to MLS Next Pro club Whitecaps FC 2. 

On 27 January 2023, Salihamidžić joined Serie B club Cosenza on a six-month loan.

International career
In addition to Germany, Salihamidžić is also eligible to represent Bosnia and Herzegovina and Spain internationally through his parents.Igor Jankovic called him up to play for the national Bosnian u21 team. They will play against the u21 side of China.

Personal life
He is the son of former Bosnian international, UEFA Champions League winner, and current Bayern Munich sports director Hasan Salihamidžić. Nick is cousin of fellow German footballer Lucas Copado, both natives of Munich, they played together for Bayern Munich II and progressed through the youth team.

Career statistics

References

Living people
2003 births
German people of Bosnia and Herzegovina descent
German people of Spanish descent
German footballers
Association football defenders
Regionalliga players
MLS Next Pro players
FC Bayern Munich footballers
Whitecaps FC 2 players
Cosenza Calcio players
German expatriate footballers
German expatriate sportspeople in Canada
Expatriate soccer players in Canada
German expatriate sportspeople in Italy
Expatriate footballers in Italy